Public holidays in Macau are dates assigned by the Macau government allowing the public administration staff to rest instead of working. The current rest days of the Macau government are Saturdays and Sundays; while public holidays basically include traditional Chinese holidays, western and Catholic festivals as well as Macau local festivals.

List

See also 
 Traditional Chinese holidays
 Public holidays in Hong Kong

References 
 Executive Order No. 60/2000 (in Chinese and in Portuguese) via the Oficial Bulletin No. 40/2000

Macau
Macau society
Public holidays in China